The rolling stock of Kolkata Metro, India consists of five classes, three classes for Line 1 and two classes for Line 2.

All trains receive 750 V DC using third rail electrification system. Trains can operate up to eight (line 1) and six (line 2) cars in length.

Since Kolkata Metro was constructed in 1970s, there were some technical limitations. Due to the tunnel dimensions, and being under Indian Railways, Kolkata Metro opted Indian metre gauge shell with  tracks. So the options of rake manufacturers for Kolkata Metro Line 1 are very limited. While, the Kolkata Metro Line 2, being modern, uses the  tracks.

Line 1 
The Kolkata Metro Line 1 has two operational classes of trains, and one is under trial.

ICF/BHEL rake 

9 rakes were manufactured by Integral Coach Factory (ICF), Chennai and were passed into service in the first phase when the metro initially ran from Esplanade to Bhawanipur. These trains were yellow in colour and had a brown stripe at the bottom. Later the colour was changed to white with a maroon stripe. Lastly, they were yellow with a wide red band at the bottom. These rakes were numbed Bn (where n was the rake no.; 1, 2,...., 9)

ICF/NGEF rake 
By 1988–90, 9 more rakes manufactured by ICF were procured and put in service when the system expanded. These rakes were tougher and had higher acceleration than the previous ones. The colors of these trains were dark green with a yellow stripe at the bottom, later they were repainted in white with a blue stripe and lastly, they were sky blue with a deep blue band at the bottom. In 2017–18, these were refurbished and put into service in a phased manner. The rakes were marked with 8N symbols.

ICF/BHEL rake 
These are the first AC trains that were passed into service in 2010, after the elevated corridor from Mahanayak Uttam Kumar to Kavi Nazrul was completed. Later, as the last extension from Kavi Nazrul to Kavi Subhash was finished, more 3000 series rakes were introduced. These trains are manufactured by ICF in collaboration with BHEL. Presently there are 13 (3000 series) rakes, which are operating on Line 1. These rakes are numbed ACn/n+1 (where (n+1)/2 is the rake number). The rolling stocks numbers are now being changed to MR-30n (where n is the rake no.; 1, 2, 3....18) as they are being gradually repainted to white and violet.

ICF/MEDHA rake 
2 prototype rakes manufactured by ICF Chennai and Medha and were supplied to Kolkata Metro by September 2017. These trains were extremely snagprone and Kolkata Metro officials took 2 years to fix the snags and to bring these trains into operation. Some of these trains were sent back to ICF during testing phase. These trains are completely different from existing AC trains made by ICF, BHEL, Knorr-Bremse. These trains have 3 phase alternating current motors, regenerative braking, stainless steel body, CCTV cameras (not present in rakes, numbered as MR-401 & MR-402), and better passenger information system. 14 rakes were delivered by April 2021.On 3 April 2019, the first ICF MEDHA rake ran between Noapara and New Garia, after 20 months. Gradually followed by 2 more rakes. After the initial hiccups these trains are praised by passengers for their comfort during braking and acceleration. Metro expressed satisfaction over the performance of the rakes as these rakes are more energy efficient. These rakes are numbed MR-40n (where n is the rake no.; 1, 2, 3....18).Currently, 18 such trains operate on Line-1. The last 3 trains of this type are compatible with both CBTC and the present DTG signalling system, although CBTC is not used on Line-1.

CRRC Dalian rake 
There was a need to replace non-AC rakes on Line 1 and so during mid 2015 it was announced that Indian Railways for the first time would rope an international train-maker, China Railway Rolling Stock Corporation (CRRC) based in Dalian. As per the tender, 14 new rakes composed of 8 coaches each will be supplied to Kolkata metro by CNR Dalian Locomotive company, a subsidiary of CRRC, which will be running on Line 1. These rakes will be of ultra-modern technology. They will have doors that will be  wider than any other metro rails in India. They will have wide vestibules,  wider than the existing trains. The design consists of the aerodynamic front with large doors and LED lights, and violet colored stripe on silver color body. The first of the 14 rakes from Chinese firm Dalian was slated to arrive by December 2017 but got delayed due to various reasons. The first rake finally arrived in Kolkata on 3 March 2019 on a vessel at Netaji Subhas Dock (NSD). Each of the 8 coaches of the rake weigh nearly 45 tonnes. The rake was unloaded and taken to Noapara carshed after which trial runs and inspection would be carried out before commencing operations. Other 13 rakes are ready, but the shipment got delayed due to the ongoing coronavirus pandemic.

These rakes were under performance trials for more than 20 months as serious problems related to performance of the rake were identified during trials. Some of the issues related to insufficient power to climb up the slopes in the tunnels and higher oscillation in the bogie.

On 17th March the first Dalian rake was inducted into service.Another 3 rakes will come soon.￼

Line 2

BEML rake 
The bidding by the Spanish company CAF for Line 2 was cancelled due to funding related problems. Re-bidding was done and BEML was given the contract for 14 rakes of 6 coaches each at a cost of 900 crore. The rakes are microprocessor controlled with 3 phase AC motors and CBTC system. The rakes were supplied to Kolkata from 2017. They are numbered MR-60n (where n is the rake no.; 1, 2, 3....14).

MCF/Dawonsys rake 
In 2019, Indian Railways approved the manufacturing of 500 aluminium body coaches at the Modern Coach Factory, in Raebareli, Uttar Pradesh, following the Transfer of Technology from Dawonsys. A prototype of 3 coaches (2 MC + 1 TC) will be received by MCF, and the rest will be built here. These will have a top speed of 100 km/h and life span of 40 years.

References

External links 

 Metro Railway, Kolkata

rolling stock
Electric multiple units of India
Rolling stock of India